The Charles City County Courthouse is a historic county courthouse located at Charles City, Charles City County, Virginia.  It was built about 1730, and is a one-story, "T"-shaped, brick structure. It has an apparently original modillion cornice and a steep hipped roof covered in tin.  It features an arcaded front.  Also on the property are a contributing Confederate monument, a late-19th century clerk's office with later additions, and a frame jail building built about 1867.

It was listed on the National Register of Historic Places in 1982.

References

External links

Charles City County Courthouse, State Route 5, Charles City, Charles City, VA: 2 photos and 2 data pages at Historic American Buildings Survey

County courthouses in Virginia
Courthouses on the National Register of Historic Places in Virginia
National Register of Historic Places in Charles City County, Virginia
Buildings and structures completed in 1730
Buildings and structures in Charles City County, Virginia